María Chiquita is a corregimiento in Portobelo District, Colón Province, Panama with a population of 2,415 as of 2010. Its population as of 1990 was 1,420; its population as of 2000 was 2,053.

References

Corregimientos of Colón Province
Populated places in Colón Province